Heparan sulfate glucosamine 3-O-sulfotransferase 1 is an enzyme that in humans is encoded by the HS3ST1 gene.

Function 

Heparan sulfate biosynthetic enzymes are key components in generating a myriad of distinct heparan sulfate fine structures that carry out multiple biologic activities. The enzyme encoded by this gene is a member of the heparan sulfate biosynthetic enzyme family. It possesses both heparan sulfate glucosaminyl 3-O-sulfotransferase activity, anticoagulant heparan sulfate conversion activity, and is a rate limiting enzyme for synthesis of anticoagulant heparan. This enzyme is an intraluminal Golgi resident protein.

Clinical significance 

Polymorphisms in HS3ST1 appear to be a risk factor for developing Alzheimer's disease.

References

Further reading

External links